Ytre Arna is a settlement in the borough of Arna in the municipality of Bergen in Vestland county, Norway. Ytre Arna is principally associated with A/S Arne Fabrikker, the country's first mechanised cotton mill. Ytre Arna Church is also located in the village.

Since 2013, Statistics Norway no longer tracked separate population statistics for Ytre Arna, instead the village was incorporated into a larger urban area called Arna.

References

Villages in Vestland
Neighbourhoods of Bergen